Sons of Society is the eleventh studio album by American heavy metal band Riot, released in Japan on July 15, 1999, and in the US on September 7, 1999, with a missing track.

Track listing

 "Queen" is a standard track on the original Japan release but is obmitted on the US and other countries' releases.

Personnel

Band members
 Mike DiMeo - lead vocals, Hammond organ, keyboards
 Mark Reale - Electric and acoustic guitars, keyboards, percussion, strings arrangements, producer
 Mike Flyntz - Electric guitars
 Pete Perez - bass
 Bobby Jarzombek - drums

Additional musicians
Frank Carrillo - sitar, tamboura
Tony Harnell, Burt Carey - backing vocals

Production
Paul Orofino - producer, engineer, mixing
Chris Cubeta - engineer
George Marino - mastering
Jeff Allen, Jack Bart - executive producers

References

1999 albums
Riot V albums
EMI Records albums
Metal Blade Records albums